Kirov Airline was an airline based in Kirov, Russia. It operated regional scheduled and charter passenger services within Russia and the Commonwealth of Independent States. Its main base was Kirov Pobedilovo Airport. Its license was revoked on 30 March 2012.

Code data 

ICAO Code: KTA

History 
The airline was established in 1992 from the Aeroflot Kirov Division.

References

External links

Defunct airlines of Russia
Airlines established in 1992
Airlines disestablished in 2012
Former Aeroflot divisions
Companies based in Kirov Oblast